Thelymitra inflata, commonly called the inflated sun orchid, is a species of orchid that is endemic to south eastern Australia. It has a single long, erect, linear leaf and up to six dark blue to purplish flowers with a very inflated lobe on top of the anther.

Description
The lobe on the top of the anther is brownish or black with a yellow tip and a narrow purplish band. It is also inflated, covered with a thick, waxy secretion and its end is split in two lobes. The side lobes slightly curved upwards and have toothbrush-like tufts of white, cream or yellow hairs. Flowering occurs from September to December but the flowers only open on warm to hot days.

Taxonomy and naming
Thelymitra inflata was first formally described in 2004 by Jeff Jeanes. The description was published in Muelleria from a specimen collected near Mylor. The specific epithet (inflata) is a Latin word meaning "puffed up" or "swollen", referring to the inflated lobe on top of the column.

Distribution and habitat
The inflated sun orchid usually grows in woodland and forest near Hobart in Tasmania, in a few sites in south-western Victoria, and in scattered sites in south-eastern South Australia.

Conservation
Thelymitra inflata is classed as "vulnerable" in South Australia. The main threat to the species in that state is the fungal disease caused by Phytophthora infestans.

References

External links
 

inflata
Endemic orchids of Australia
Orchids of Victoria (Australia)
Orchids of South Australia
Orchids of Tasmania
Plants described in 2004